Bythinella reyniesii is a species of very small freshwater snail, an aquatic gastropod mollusk in the family Amnicolidae.

Distribution 
These snails live in springs. They were long believed to occur only in Andorra, Austria, and parts of France. This disjunct distribution was puzzling, until it was realized that the populations assigned to several other supposedly distinct species actually seem to all belong to one species. In fact, Bythinella reyniesii is probably widespread from western Germany and nearby Belgium through central and eastern France to Andorra.

Description and genetics 
These are small snails, with a nearly cylindrical shell measuring just over 2 mm in length. There is little morphological and almost no genetic variation between the supposed "species". Thus, even though the proposed synonymy resulted from mtDNA COI and nDNA ITS1 sequence data analyses applied to the phylogenetic species concept (which does not recognize subspecies), as opposed to the morphologically diverse Bythinella bicarinata it might not even be warranted to accept the formerly distinct taxa as subspecies.

Conservation status 
The northeastern specimens formerly separated in Bythinella compressa were classified as Vulnerable (B1+2c), as they were known from less than ten freshwater springs which are affected by pollution. Bythinella reyniesii, in the traditional sense was classified as a Species of Least Concern (meaning it is not considered globally threatened), and this assessment applies to the species in the expanded sense also.

References

Bythinella
Gastropods described in 1851
Taxonomy articles created by Polbot